Helicotylenchus dihystera (Steiner's spiral nematode) is a plant pathogenic nematode. It is known to inhabit sugarcane, rice, potatoes, corn, peanut, millet, sorghum, banana and forest trees.

See also
 Sodium azide - used for agricultural control of Helicotylenchus dihystera

Notes

External links 
 Nemaplex, University of California - Helicotylenchus dihystera

Tylenchida
Nematodes described in 1961
Agricultural pest nematodes
Banana diseases
Maize diseases
Peanut diseases
Potato diseases
Rice diseases
Sorghum diseases
Sugarcane diseases
Tree diseases